The Sunshine Millions Classic is an American race for thoroughbred horses held annually in January at Santa Anita Park in Arcadia, California and at Gulfstream Park in Hallandale Beach, Florida.  Part of the eight-race Sunshine Millions series, half of the races are run at one track, and half at the other.

The "Classic" is open to horses four-years-old and older willing to race one and one-eighth miles on the dirt. It is a restricted event currently offering a purse of $250,000.

The Sunshine Millions series races are restricted to horses bred either in Florida or in California.

The racing series was created by the Thoroughbred Owners of California, the California Thoroughbred Breeders Association, the Florida Thoroughbred Breeders' and Owners' Association, Inc., Santa Anita Park, Gulfstream Park, and Magna Entertainment Corporation.

Records 

Speed record: 
  miles – 1:45.64 – Go Between (2008)

Most wins by a horse:
 2 – Mucho Macho Man   (2012, 2014)

Most wins by a jockey:
 3 – Russell Baze   (2009, 2011 & 2012)

Most wins by a trainer:
 2 – Jenine Sahadi    (2001 & 2002)
 2 – Jerry Hollendorfer    (2007 & 2012)
 2 – Katherine Ritvo    (2012 & 2014)

Winners Sunshine Millions Classic since 2003

References
 Sunshine Millions Classic at the NTRA

Restricted stakes races in the United States
Horse races in Florida
Horse races in California
Open mile category horse races
Sports competitions in Los Angeles County, California